Valeriano López Mendiola (born 4 May 1926 in Casma — died 7 May 1993 in Callao) was a football forward from Peru, nicknamed Tanque de Casma. Recognized as one of Peru's most important players, he was an all round forward with great finishing, positioning, and heading skills.

Prolific goalscorer, next to Ferreyra and Friedenreich, have been only the American professional footballers with an average of more than 1 goal per match, having made 207 goals in 199 games of 1946 to his retirement in 1960.

Career
López's career began with the Peruvian club Sport Boys at the age of 20. He became a prolific goalscorer, winning the Peruvian league top-scorer honor its three first seasons, (1946, 1947 and 1948) with 62 goals scored in 54 matches. After a successful beginning in Peru, in 1949 it is punished to perpetuity for the practice of soccer to escape of the concentration of the Peru national football team days before the South American Championship of Brazil.

López moved to Colombia club Deportivo Cali and remains one of their most iconic players.

Honours

Individual Honours

Peruvian Championship's Top Scorer: 1946, 1947, 1948, 1951 
 1948 Bolivarian Games: Best Player
 1948 Bolivarian Games: Top Scorer
 1951 South American Top scorer on the year
 1952 Panamerican Championship: Top Scorer

Records
He also set a record by scoring in 12 consecutive Colombian League games.

References

External links

 Biography of Valeriano López

1926 births
1993 deaths
People from Casma Province
Association football forwards
Peruvian footballers
Peru international footballers
Peruvian Primera División players
Categoría Primera A players
Argentine Primera División players
Sport Boys footballers
Deportivo Cali footballers
Club Atlético Huracán footballers
Club Alianza Lima footballers
Peruvian expatriate footballers
Expatriate footballers in Argentina
Expatriate footballers in Colombia